Jabara (:ja:ジャバラ) or Citrus jabara (Tanaka) refers to a plant and fruit that is among the Japanese citrus.

Jabara is a fruit similar to the yuzu, deriving from a cross of the yuzu with a pomelo-hybridized mandarin (Citrus nobilis, but distinct from King), that arose naturally in Wakayama Prefecture, Japan

An extract made from the pericarp of the jabara has been used in cosmetics.

See also
Yūkō

References

External links

 EurekaMag, medicinal properties
 Volatile compounds

jabara
Japanese fruit